("cross wave") was the last of 32  destroyers built for the Imperial Japanese Navy (IJN) in the first decade of the 20th century.

Design and description
The Kamikaze-class destroyers were improved versions of the preceding . The Kamikazes were powered by two vertical triple-expansion steam engines, each driving one shaft using steam produced by four Kampon water-tube boilers. Their crew consisted of 70 officers and ratings.

The main armament of the Kamikaze-class ships consisted of two 40-calibre quick-firing (QF)  12 cwt guns on single mounts; the forward gun was located on superstructure, but the aft gun was at the stern. Four 28-calibre QF three-inch 8 cwt guns on single mounts were positioned abreast the superstructure, two in each broadside. The ships were also armed with two single rotating mounts for  torpedoes between the superstructure and the stern gun. When Isonami was converted into a minesweeper in 1924, she was rearmed with a pair of  3rd Year Type guns taken from older ships on single mounts and the three-inch 8 cwt guns were removed.

Construction and career 
Ayanami was launched at Maizuru Naval Arsenal on 20 March 1909 and completed on 26 June. The ship served during World War I and participated in the Siberian Expedition. She was converted into a minesweeper on 1 December 1924 and was renamed W-9 on 1 August 1928. The ship was decommissioned on 1 June 1930, but she continued in service as a tugboat and a dispatch boat until 19 April 1935 and was subsequently scrapped.

Notes

Citations

Books

 

Kamikaze-class destroyers (1905)
1909 ships
World War I destroyers of Japan
Ships built by Maizuru Naval Arsenal